Cherryfield may refer to:

 Cherryfield, Maine, United States
 Cherryfield, New Brunswick, Canada
 Cherryfield, Nova Scotia, Canada